A Midsummer Theatre was a Canadian dramatic television series which aired on CBC Television in 1958.

Premise
The Montreal-produced series consisted of various plays, many of which were written specifically for the programme. Featured playwrights included Eugene Cloutier (Mary Ann), M. Charles Cohen (A Dispute of Long Standing, The Equalizer and Trio), Joseph Schull (The Eleventh Hour), Roy Shields (Monsieur Mac-Greg-Or) and Roderick Wilkinson (The Colonel).

Scheduling
The half-hour series aired Fridays at 9:00 p.m. (Eastern) from 25 July to 5 September 1958,

External links
 

CBC Television original programming
1950s Canadian anthology television series
1958 Canadian television series debuts
1958 Canadian television series endings
Black-and-white Canadian television shows